The FIL World Luge Championships 2001 took place in Calgary, Alberta, Canada, for the third time after hosting the event previously in 1990 and 1993.

Men's singles

Women's singles

Men's doubles

Mixed team

Medal table

References
Men's doubles World Champions
Men's singles World Champions
Mixed teams World Champions
Women's singles World Champions

FIL World Luge Championships
2001 in luge
2001 in Canadian sports
International luge competitions hosted by Canada